Carl Johan Hviid (27 June 1899 – 21 October 1964) was a Danish film actor. He appeared in 29 films between 1938 and 1964. He was born and died in Denmark.

Selected filmography

Kongen bød - 1938
Champagnegaloppen - 1938
Under byens tage - 1938
Sommerglæder - 1940
En herre i kjole og hvidt - 1942
Søren Søndervold - 1942
Erik Ejegods pilgrimsfærd - 1943
Det store ansvar - 1944
De tre skolekammerater - 1944
Otte akkorder - 1944
Det kære København - 1944
Mens sagføreren sover - 1945
Den usynlige hær - 1945
Brevet fra afdøde - 1946
Far betaler - 1946
Soldaten og Jenny - 1947
Penge som græs - 1948
Den stjålne minister - 1949
For frihed og ret - 1949
Lynfotografen - 1950
Min kone er uskyldig - 1950
Smedestræde 4 - 1950
Mød mig på Cassiopeia - 1951
Bag de røde porte - 1951
 Count Svensson (1951)
Farlig ungdom - 1953
Karen, Maren og Mette - 1954
En sømand går i land - 1954
Arvingen - 1954
Himlen er blå - 1954
I kongens klær - 1954
Blændværk - 1955
På tro og love - 1955
Færgekroen - 1956
Kristiane af Marstal - 1956
Far til fire i byen - 1956
Tag til marked i Fjordby - 1956
Over alle grænser - 1958
Den sidste vinter - 1960
Weekend - 1962
Pigen og pressefotografen - 1963
Hvis lille pige er du? - 1963
Støvsugerbanden - 1963
 - 1965

External links

1899 births
1964 deaths
Danish male film actors
People from Frederiksberg